Monopole may refer to:

 Magnetic monopole, or Dirac monopole, a hypothetical particle that may be loosely described as a magnet with only one pole
 Monopole (mathematics), a connection over a principal bundle G with a section (the Higgs field) of the associated adjoint bundle
 Monopole, the first term in a multipole expansion
 Monopole (wine), an appellation owned by only one winery
 Monopole (album), a 2011 album by White Town
 Monopole antenna, a radio antenna that replaces half of a dipole antenna with a ground plane at right-angles to the remaining half
 Monopole, a tubular self-supporting telecommunications mast
 The Monopole, a bar in Plattsburgh, NY
 Établissements Monopole, a French auto parts manufacturer, racing car builder and racing team.

See also
 Dipole, a particle with a north and south pole
 Dyon, a particle with electric and magnetic charge
 Instanton, a class of field solutions that includes monopoles
 Monomial, a polynomial which has only one term
 Monopoly (disambiguation)
 Seiberg-Witten monopole, a solution of the Seiberg-Witten equations
 't Hooft–Polyakov monopole, analogous to Dirac monopole, but without singularities
 Wu–Yang monopole, a monopole solution of Yang-Mills equations